Charles Raymond Hancock (16 February 1925 – 20 April 2007) was an English football goalkeeper. He was Ken Hancock's elder brother. He played for Port Vale between 1948 and 1956, and later turned out for Northwich Victoria. He was Vale's regular custodian as the club finished second in the Third Division North in 1952–53.

Career
Hancock played for Abbey Hulton United and Bury before joining Port Vale in May 1948. He made three Third Division South appearances in the 1948–49 campaign, but manager Gordon Hodgson kept him behind George Heppell and Ray King in the first team pecking order. Hancock, now aged 27, was selected by manager Freddie Steele as the club's first team goalkeeper in the 1952–53 season, as Vale posted a second-place finish in the Third Division North. However, King regained his first team spot in the 1953–54 season, as Vale won the league title and reached the semi-finals of the FA Cup – Hancock featured just once all season. He played one Second Division game in 1954–55 and featured twice in 1955–56. Having made 53 appearances in all competitions for the "Valiants" he departed Vale Park when he was transferred to Northwich Victoria in the summer of 1956.

Personal life
Hancock married wife Joan, a schoolteacher, in 1949. He worked at Masons Textiles in Leek, Staffordshire for many years.

Career statistics
Source:

Honours
Port Vale
Football League Third Division North: 1953–54

References

1925 births
2007 deaths
Footballers from Stoke-on-Trent
English footballers
Association football goalkeepers
Bury F.C. players
Port Vale F.C. players
Northwich Victoria F.C. players
English Football League players